The Womrather Höhe is a hill, and the highest peak in the Lützelsoon hills, part of the Hunsrück mountains of Germany's Central Uplands. It is located in the counties of Rhein-Hunsrück-Kreis and Bad Kreuznach in the state of Rhineland-Palatinate.

The forested hill lies on the boundary between Schlierschied (Rhein-Hunsrück-Kreis) to the northwest and Kellenbach (Bad Kreuznach) to the southeast. It was named after the Hunsrück parish of Womrath, 7 kilometres to the north, which owned 3 plots of land in the parish of Schlierschied below the Womrather Höhe until the major exchange of forest estates in the region in 1966.

Views over the Lützelsoon hills and their surrounding area are possible at the observation tower known as Langer Heinrich on the Teufelsfels around 2 kilometres to the southwest.

References

External links 
 Private website about the Lützelsoon

Mountains and hills of Rhineland-Palatinate
Mountains and hills of the Hunsrück